Sir Richard Burn  (1 February 1871 – 26 July 1947) was an English civil servant in British India, historian of India and numismatist. He was the editor of Volume IV of The Cambridge History of India and contributed four chapters to Volume VI of that work on the Indian political situation after 1900.

Early life 
Burn was born in Liverpool, educated at the Liverpool Institute, then at Christ Church College, University of Oxford.

Career in India 
Burn entered the Indian Civil Service in 1891. He became Under-Secretary to the Government of the United Provinces in 1897, Superintendent of the Census 1900, and of the Imperial Gazetteer in 1902, and editor in 1905.

He was Secretary to the Government of the United Provinces, and member of the Legislative Council, from 1910 (Chief Secretary, 1912). He became a Commissioner in 1918 and member of the Board of Revenue, United Provinces, in 1922. In 1926 he was Acting Finance Member. Burn retired in 1927.

Burn was awarded the Kaiser-i-Hind gold medal for famine services in India in 1907–08, and knighted in 1927.

The Imperial Gazetteer of India 

Burn was the third editor in India of the new edition of The Imperial Gazetteer of India, replacing William Stevenson Meyer who had himself replaced Sir Herbert Risley, both of whom had been promoted to more senior positions. The Gazetteer was published in 26 volumes at Oxford from 1909. The first edition had been published in 1881 and the second in 1885–87.

In a paper read before the Indian Section of The Royal Society of Arts in 1908, Burn described the great efforts that had been made to improve on earlier editions of the Gazetteer, including a vastly expanded contents and the inclusion of a detailed atlas. He reported that it had taken years of discussion to settle the form of the work:

Numismatics 
Burn was a knowledgeable numismatist, producing papers on the subject that were published in the Numismatic Chronicle and the journals of the Royal Asiatic Society and the Asiatic Society of Bengal. He was a founder member, in 1910, of the Numismatic Society of India.

Selected publications 
Census report of the United Provinces. 1902.
The Imperial Gazetteer of India. 3rd edition. Clarendon Press, Oxford, from 1909. (Editor)
The Cambridge History of India Vol. IV The Mughul period. University Press, Cambridge, 1937. Planned by Wolseley Haig, edited by Richard Burn.
The Cambridge History of India Vol. VI. The Indian Empire, 1858–1918. With chapters on the development of administration, 1818–1858. 1932. Edited by H.H. Dodwell. Four chapters by Richard Burn.

References 

1871 births
1947 deaths
Writers from Liverpool
English Indologists
People educated at Liverpool Institute High School for Boys
Alumni of Christ Church, Oxford
Companions of the Order of the Star of India
Indian Civil Service (British India) officers
British administration in Uttar Pradesh
Recipients of the Kaisar-i-Hind Medal
Knights Bachelor